Tirora (also spelled Tiroda) is a city and a municipal council in Gondia district of Maharashtra, India. Adani Power Maharashtra Limited , Tirora is the largest coal based Thermal Power Plant in the state of Maharashtra, India. The plant has a capacity to generate 3300 MW power through its 5 units of 660 MW capacity.

Demographics
 India census, Tirora had a population of 25,181. Males constitute 50% of the population and females 50%. Tirora has an average literacy rate of 75%, higher than the national average of 59.5%: male literacy is 83%, and female literacy is 67%. In Tirora, 12% of the population is under 6 years of age.

Industry
Adani Power Maharashtra Limited (APML), is 3 km away from Tirora on Tirora-Gondia state road. Coal is transported to Adani power, Ltd through a railway which is connected to Kachewani Railway Station.  Water is being used from nearby weir constructed on Wainganga River.  An 85.89% subsidiary of Adani Power Limited is implementing 3300 MW Thermal Power Station in Tirora.

References

Cities and towns in Gondia district
Talukas in Maharashtra